Bethlehem Township is one of twelve townships in Clark County, Indiana. As of the 2010 census, its population was 309 and it contained 127 housing units.

History
Bethlehem Township was organized in 1816. It was named after the town of Bethlehem, Indiana.

Geography

Unincorporated towns
 Bethlehem
 Miles Point
 Otto
(This list is based on USGS data and may include former settlements.)

Adjacent townships
 Owen Township (southwest)
 Washington Township (west)
 Saluda Township, Jefferson County (northwest)

Cemeteries
The township contains several cemeteries: Antioch, Bethlehem, Camp Creek, Louden, Mikesell, New Hope, Otto, Palmer, Patterson, Ross, Tiaris, Turner, and Waters (aka Stoner).

References
 
 United States Census Bureau cartographic boundary files

External links

 Indiana Township Association
 United Township Association of Indiana

Townships in Clark County, Indiana
Townships in Indiana
1816 establishments in Indiana
Populated places established in 1816